Ihor Ihorovych Bilan (born 29 July 1973) is a Ukrainian professional football coach and a former player.

In winter of 2019 Bilan began working as goalkeeper coach in Nyva Ternopil in a coaching staff of Vasyl Malyk. At the end of 2020 he was placed at the helm of the senior squad. On 12 April 2021 Bilan was let go.

References

External links
 

1973 births
Living people
Ukrainian footballers
Association football goalkeepers
FC Halychyna Drohobych players
FC Dnipro Cherkasy players
FC Cherkasy-2 players
FC Spartak Ivano-Frankivsk players
FC Hoverla Uzhhorod players
FC Ihroservice Simferopol players
MFC Mykolaiv players
FC Lviv players
FC Arsenal-Kyivshchyna Bila Tserkva players
FC Mykolaiv players
Ukrainian First League players
Ukrainian football managers
FC Nyva Ternopil managers
Sportspeople from Lviv Oblast